The  is a complex consisting of three halls in two buildings in Hayabusachō, a district in Chiyoda, Tokyo, Japan. The Japan Arts Council, an Independent Administrative Institution of the Ministry of Education, Culture, Sports, Science and Technology, operates the National Theatre. It primarily stages performances of traditional Japanese performing arts.

Outline
The main building has two halls. The Large Theatre hosts performances of kabuki and Buyō as well as stage plays. The Small Hall specializes in bunraku, Japanese music, smaller buyō productions, gagaku, shōmyō, and folk theatre. In a separate building, the Engei Hall stages rakugo and manzai performances.

Each year in April, the awards ceremony for the Japan Prize takes place in the National Theatre. Attendees include the Emperor and Empress, the Prime Minister, the President of the House of Councillors, and the Speaker of the House of Representatives.

Performances
The 1995 Japanese Drumming Concert, sponsored by the National Theatre of Japan, featured artists such as Tokyo Dagekidan.

In 2010, a double bill of Yukio Mishima's Iwashi Uri Koi Hikiami and Roben Sugi no Yurai was performed.

In February 2019, the Farewell Jubilee celebrations for the Emperor Akihito will take place.

References

External links
 

Theatres in Tokyo
Arts centres in Japan
Theatres completed in 1966
Buildings and structures in Chiyoda, Tokyo
1966 establishments in Japan